Lorenzo Moore (1 September 1808 – 13 August 1894) was a notable New Zealand Anglican clergyman. He was born in Blessington, County Wicklow, Ireland on 1 September 1808.

References

1808 births
1894 deaths
19th-century New Zealand Anglican priests